The 47th New Zealand Parliament was a term of the Parliament of New Zealand. Its composition was determined by the 2002 election, and it sat until 11 August 2005.

The Labour Party and the Progressive Party, backed by United Future, commanded a majority throughout the 47th Parliament. The Labour-led administration was in its second term. The National Party, although dealt a significant blow in the last election, remained the largest opposition party. Other non-government parties were New Zealand First, ACT, the Greens, and (from mid-2004) the Māori Party.

The 47th Parliament consisted of 120 representatives. Sixty-nine of these were chosen by geographical electorates, including seven Māori electorates. The remainder were elected by means of party-list proportional representation under the MMP electoral system.

Electoral boundaries for the 47th Parliament

Overview of seats
The table below shows the number of MPs in each party following the 2002 election and at dissolution:

Notes
 United Future supported the Labour-Progressive coalition on a confidence and supply basis.
 Tariana Turia resigned as MP and from the Labour Party on 30 April 2004 following the foreshore and seabed controversy. She won the resulting by-election under the banner of the new Māori Party.
 The Working Government majority is calculated as all Government MPs less all other parties.

Initial composition of the 47th Parliament
The initial members of the 47th Parliament were as follows:

By-elections during 47th Parliament
There was one by-election held during the term of the 47th Parliament.

Summary of changes during term
Graham Kelly, a Labour list MP, left Parliament on 29 July 2003 to take up a position as High Commissioner to Canada. Moana Mackey, the next candidate on Labour's party list, entered Parliament in his place. 
Donna Awatere Huata, an ACT list MP, was officially declared an independent on 11 November 2003. This followed her suspension from the ACT caucus on 11 February 2003 after allegations of fraud were made against her. After a lengthy legal fight which went all the way to the Supreme Court, she was expelled from Parliament on 19 November 2004. She was replaced by Kenneth Wang on 30 November.
Tariana Turia, the Labour MP for Te Tai Hauauru, resigned from Parliament over the foreshore and seabed issue on 17 May 2004. On 10 July, Turia won the resulting by-election under the banner of the new Māori Party, and took her seat again on 27 July.
Jonathan Hunt, a Labour list MP, left Parliament on 30 March 2005 to take up a position as High Commissioner to the United Kingdom. Lesley Soper, the next candidate on Labour's party list, was sworn in to replace him on 5 April.

Seating plan

As on 10 August 2004 
The chamber is in a horseshoe-shape.

References

New Zealand parliaments